Emerson is a city in far southern Bartow County, Georgia, United States, on highways US-41, GA-293, and I-75. The population was 1,470 at the 2010 census, an increase of 34% over the 2000 count of 1,092.

Emerson is a gateway to Red Top Mountain State Park, a Georgia state park, which is surrounded by Lake Allatoona.

History
An early variant name was "Stegall's Station". Emerson was incorporated in 1889, and named for Joseph Emerson Brown, the 42nd Governor of Georgia. In 2022, the mayor of Emerson, Al Pallone, and his wife, were killed in a vehicular accident involving a drunk driver.

Geography
Emerson is located at  (34.131111, -84.752778).

Demographics

2020 census

As of the 2020 United States census, there were 1,415 people, 629 households, and 469 families residing in the city.

2000 census
As of the census of 2000, there were 1,092 people, 382 households, and 297 families residing in the city. The racial makeup of the city was 80.13% White, 17.03% African American, 0.46% Native American, 0.27% Asian, 0.55% from other races, and 1.56% from two or more races. Hispanic or Latino people of any race were 2.38% of the population.

There were 382 households, out of which 31.2% had children under the age of 18 living with them, 57.9% were married couples living together, 14.4% had a female householder with no husband present, and 22.0% were non-families. 19.1% of all households were made up of individuals, and 8.9% had someone living alone who was 65 years of age or older.  The average household size was 2.84 and the average family size was 3.21.

In the city, the population was spread out, with 26.6% under the age of 18, 8.1% from 18 to 24, 30.4% from 25 to 44, 23.5% from 45 to 64, and 11.4% who were 65 years of age or older.  The median age was 35 years. For every 100 females, there were 95.3 males.  For every 100 females age 18 and over, there were 92.5 males.

The median income for a household in the city was $36,181, and the median income for a family was $41,429. Males had a median income of $29,250 versus $24,375 for females. The per capita income for the city was $16,270.  About 12.3% of families and 16.4% of the population were below the poverty line, including 22.9% of those under age 18 and 17.9% of those age 65 or over.

Film and television 
Emerson has served as the backdrop for many film and television production scenes. The television mini-series Manhunt: Unabomber was filmed in Emerson along with portions of the film The 5th Wave. Old Alabama Road in Emerson has appeared in several Fast & Furious movies.

Schools 
Emerson is home to three schools:

 Emerson Elementary School
 Red Top Middle School
 Excel Christian Academy

References

External links
City of Emerson

Cities in Georgia (U.S. state)
Cities in Bartow County, Georgia